Half Baked is the eighth studio album by rapper Yukmouth. It was released on April 24, 2012, through Smoke-a-Lot Records.

Track listing

References

External links 
 Smokelotrecords.com Official Label Website
 
 
 

2012 albums
Yukmouth albums